The white-headed wood hoopoe (Phoeniculus bollei) is a species of bird in the family Phoeniculidae.

Etymology
The bird's scientific species name bollei honors Carl August Bolle (1821-1909), a German naturalist and collector.

Subspecies
Subspecies include:
 Phoeniculus bollei jacksoni (Hartlaub, 1858) — Ruwenzori Mountains to Sudan and Kenya
 Phoeniculus bollei bollei — from Liberia to the Central African Republic
 Phoeniculus bollei okuensis (Serle, 1949) — Cameroon (Lake Oku)

Distribution
Phoeniculus bollei can be found in Burundi, Cameroon, Central African Republic, Democratic Republic of the Congo, Ivory Coast, Ghana, Guinea, Kenya, Liberia, Mali, Nigeria, Rwanda, South Sudan, Tanzania, and Uganda.

Habitat

Description

The female is smaller and has a much shorter bill. These birds show a combination of a white head, a slightly curved bright red beak and red legs and feet, quite different from other species of the family. The iridescent plumage is dark blue or violet-blu. The wings have a purple-copper luster.

Biology
These birds are very gregarious, forming groups of 2 to 10 individuals. They apparently breed almost throughout year, in both wet and dry seasons. They are predominantly insectivorous, especially feeding on various arthropods (Larvae, beetles, ants, termites, grasshoppers, spiders, etc.) and invertebrates, that they search examining tree trunks. Sometimes they also feed on berries and seeds. In the east of its range in Kenya and Tanzania it nests only in mountain biotopes above 2000 m.
The nests are located in a natural cavity in a dead or healthy tree, up to 40 meters above the ground.

References

white-headed wood hoopoe
Birds of the African tropical rainforest
white-headed wood hoopoe
Taxonomy articles created by Polbot